, also known as Discommunication, is a Japanese manga series written and illustrated by Masami Yuki. It was serialized in Shogakukan's seinen manga magazine Monthly Big Comic Spirits from April 2013 to October 2017.

Publication
Written and illustrated by Masami Yuki, Disu × Komi debuted in Shogakukan's seinen manga magazine Monthly Big Comic Spirits on April 27, 2013. The manga was irregularly serialized in the magazine. It finished on October 27, 2017. Shogakukan collected its chapters in three tankōbon volumes, released from January 9, 2015, to January 12, 2018.

Volume list

References

External links
 

Comedy anime and manga
Manga creation in anime and manga
Masami Yuki
Seinen manga
Shogakukan manga